Above the Golden State was an American Christian rock band from Portland, Oregon. Their self-titled debut album, Above the Golden State, was released on July 22, 2008 through Sparrow Records. The band's first single from the album was "Sound of Your Name", which was included in WOW Hits 2009 as a bonus track. An EP (extended play) called "The Golden Rule" was released in 2010, with lead single "I Am Loved". On April 3, 2012, The band released a new EP titled "Word's Don't Act," reflecting the name of its first track. The band then raised money for the independent release, at the same time changing the band's name to Nations. The self-titled album "Nations" was released on August 27, 2013.

Musical style
Above the Golden State has been described as being indie rock and Christian, but Above the Golden State self-describe their music as "west coast rock, pop." Lead singer Michael Watson said "we're doing our best not to call it surf rock—basically, it's that with a touch of the rainy northwest." The band has said that they are fans of all musical styles, and have been influenced by Weezer, Five Iron Frenzy and Delirious?, as well as the Beatles and Duke Ellington.

Members
 Michael Watson – lead vocals, guitar 
Tim Aylward
Brook Mosser

Discography

Studio albums

EPs
2010: The Golden Rule EP
2012: Words Don't Act EP

Singles

References

External links
 

American Christian rock groups
American musical trios
Sparrow Records artists
Musical groups established in 2007